The Ilvates were a Ligurian tribe, whose name is found only in the writings of Livy. He mentions them first as taking up arms in 200 BCE, in concert with the Gaulish tribes of the Insubres and Cenomani, to destroy the Roman colonies of Placentia (modern Piacenza) and Cremona. They are again noticed three years later as being still in arms, after the submission of their Transpadane allies; but in the course of that year's campaign (197 BCE) they were reduced by the consul Quintus Minucius Rufus, and their name does not again appear in history. (Liv. xxx. 10, xxxi. 29, 30.) From the circumstances here related, it is clear that they dwelt on the north slopes of the Apennines, towards the plains of the Padus (modern Po River), and apparently not very far from Clastidium (modern Casteggio); but we cannot determine with certainty either the position or extent of their territory. Their name, like those of most of the Ligurian tribes mentioned by Livy, had disappeared in the Augustan age, and is not found in any of the ancient geographers. Charles Athanase Walckenaer, however, supposed the Eleates over whom the consul Marcus Fulvius Nobilior celebrated a triumph in 159 BCE and who are in all probability the same people with the Veleiates of Pliny, to be identical also with the Ilvates of Livy; but this cannot be assumed without further proof.

Notes

References

Ligures